Dongfang in Chinese or Dongbang in Korean is a compound surname in East Asia. Dongfang has two points of origin. One branch is said to be descended from the Fuxi clan, which originated in the east; the other is said to be descended from Dongfang Shuo, whose original family name was Zhang.

Dongfang is the 119th surname in Hundred Family Surnames.

Notable people named Dongfang
Dongfang Shuo, poet in Han Dynasty
Dongfang Qiu, poet and historian in Tang Dynasty
Dongfang Xian, scholar in Tang Dynasty
Dongfang Bubai, fictional character from The Smiling, Proud Wanderer

References

Chinese-language surnames
Korean-language surnames of Chinese origin
Individual Chinese surnames